Bohetherick is a village in the Tamar valley in east Cornwall, England, in the United Kingdom, approximately five miles (8 km) north of Saltash. It is in the civil parish of St Dominic

References

External links

Villages in Cornwall